Highland Academy is a Seventh-day Adventist boarding and day school located on a  campus in Portland, Tennessee.  It is owned and operated by the Kentucky-Tennessee Conference of Seventh-day Adventists. It is a part of the Seventh-day Adventist education system, the world's second largest Christian school system.

General information 

Highland Academy is a co-educational boarding and day school. Any students grades 9 through 12 may attend.

The school does not have varsity or inter-school sports, but features an active intramural sports program and large performing gymnastics team.

The school offers a variety of jobs for students to offset the cost of tuition. Three Signature Healthcare companies located on Highland's campus also provide work opportunities - these are The Bridge at Highland (a nursing home and rehabilitation center), SHC Construction, and SHC Furniture

Campus 

The campus is made up about 300 acres and includes an administration facility with classrooms, a music building, both a boys' dormitory and girls' dormitory with the cafeteria on the ground floor, gymnasium, grounds/maintenance building, and woodworking shop.

Other notable structures on campus include an outdoor classroom, small cabins for attendees of the annual camp meeting held on campus, and a building for temporary book and food storage/sales during camp meeting. There are several areas with water and electric hookups to be used during that time.

A church with approximately 700 members is located next to the campus. Students and faculty join with community there for religious services.
Highland Elementary School is also located nearby. Highland Elementary is operated by the Highland Seventh-day Adventist Church and offers grades Pre-K to 8.

Curriculum
The schools curriculum consists primarily of the standard courses taught at college preparatory schools across the world. All students are required to take classes in the core areas of English, Basic Sciences, Mathematics, a Foreign Language, and Social Sciences.

Spiritual aspects
All students take religion classes each year that they are enrolled. These classes cover topics in biblical history and Christian and denominational doctrines. Instructors in other disciplines also begin each class period with prayer or a short devotional thought, many which encourage student input. Weekly, the entire student body gathers together in the auditorium for a half hour-long chapel service.
Outside the classrooms there is year-round spiritually oriented programming that relies on student involvement.

See also

 List of Seventh-day Adventist secondary schools
 Seventh-day Adventist education

References

External links

Private high schools in Tennessee
Boarding schools in Tennessee
Adventist secondary schools in the United States
Schools in Sumner County, Tennessee